John Pratt Kempthorne (called Pratt; b Auckland 16 Oct 1849 - d Nelson 10 Sep 1931)   was an Anglican priest in the last three decades of the Nineteenth century and the first three of the 20th.

Kempthorne was educated at Church of England Grammar School, Auckland; St John's College, Auckland; and Bishopdale College. He was ordained deacon in 1873, and priest in 1876. After a curacy in Stoke he held incumbencies at Reefton, Greymouth and Nelson. He was Archdeacon of Waimea from 1916 to 1926.

References

People from Auckland
People educated at King's College, Auckland
19th-century New Zealand Anglican priests
20th-century New Zealand Anglican priests
1849 births
1931 deaths
Archdeacons of Waimea
People educated at St John's College, Auckland
People educated at Bishopdale College